Kabompo is a town in north-western Zambia, lying on the Kabompo River with a population over 88,000 people. It is surrounded by teak forest and is home to a Roman Catholic mission.

Its most significant activity is the production of honey. You also find a water falls called Chikata.

Kabompo House, No. J11a, Kabompo Township, to which Kenneth Kaunda (first president of post independence Zambia) was restricted by the Colonial authorities from March to July 1959 is a noted national monument.

Kabompo has six main local languages these being Lunda, Luvale, Nkoya, Luchazi, Chokwe and Mbunda. The main tradition ceremonies that take place include Lukwakwa, Mbuda Liyoyelo and Chiweka.

The district has a few recreation facilities and it has Guesthouses and Lodges that offer accommodation with other related facilities. Some of the lodges with high standards services include Chidikumbidi Lodge and Golden Jubilee Lodge.  It has Finance bank (z) Ltd as the only Bank and it has a district hospital that caters for the local people as well as a police station.
It has one fuel filling station that caters for the entire district and it runs out of fuel sometimes due to high demand.
The major source of power is the Thermal power provided by Zesco Ltd, however, it is being connected to reliable power through the national grid.
The district has no established bakeries and people rely on the small scale bakeries.

Transport
The district is accessible by a tarred road (the M8 road) that stretches from Solwezi to Chavuma and it is about 365 km from Solwezi. There is an interesting cable ferry across the Kabompo River 80 km to the south-east. There is an air strip.

Education
Kabompo district has eight major secondary schools these being Kabompo Secondary school, Chiweza Secondary School, Pokola day Secondary school, Kabulamema Secondary School, Kamashila Secondary School, Kanaji Chilanda Secondary School, Chikenge Secondary School and Kayombo Secondary school.

References

Populated places in North-Western Province, Zambia